NCBI or National Center for Biotechnology Information is part of the US National Institutes of Health.

NCBI may also refer to:
 National Coalition Building Institute
 National Council for the Blind of Ireland